Lynch's Irish Pub F.C. (usually known by the shortened name, Lynch's F.C.) is an American amateur soccer team based in Jacksonville, Florida, United States. Founded in 1999, the team plays in the Beaches Adult Soccer League, part of Region III of the United States Adult Soccer Association.

The team plays its home games at Patton Park. The team's colors are green and white.

History
The team was founded in 1999 by soccer fans who frequented Lynch's Irish Pub in Jacksonville Beach, Florida. They were known as D. S. United until 2004, when the owners changed the name to Lynch's Irish Pub F.C. to reflect their history and their sponsorship arrangement with the pub. Lynch's played in the Beaches Adult Soccer League, a member of the United States Adult Soccer Association Region III group of leagues. In 2014 Beaches Adult Soccer League became a member of USSSA.

Lynch's has a distinguished history in the Lamar Hunt U.S. Open Cup, having qualified for the final stages of the tournament three times. As D. S. United, they qualified for their first Cup in 2003, but lost 4–1 in the first round to Raleigh CASL Elite of the USL Premier Development League. The newly monickered Lynch's qualified for the cup the a second time in 2007, topping their regional qualification group containing Dallas Roma and Saturn FC in the final round of tournament, before losing 2–0 to the Charlotte Eagles in the first round of the tournament proper.

Lynch's qualified for the final stages of the cup again in 2009, topping their regional qualifying group (that included Pumas FC, Baton Rouge Classics and Greenwood Wanderers), before losing 2–1 in the first round to USL First Division side Miami FC. Lynch's goal against Miami was scored by Tommy Krizanovic.

Players

2009 USOC roster

Year-by-year

Head coaches
  Roberto Apunte (2007-2014)
  Moses Williams (2009)
  Patrick Cannon (2010–present)

Stadia
 Patton Park; Jacksonville, Florida (2007–present)

References

External links
 Official Site
 US Open Cup: Meet Lynch's Irish Pub

Soccer clubs in Florida
Sports teams in Jacksonville, Florida
Florida Elite Soccer League
1999 establishments in Florida
Association football clubs established in 1999